Gunplay may refer to:

Arts and entertainment
 Gunplay (comics), a 2008 graphic novel by Jorge Vega
 Gunplay (film), a 1951 American Western film
 Gunplay (rapper) (born 1979), American rapper
 "Gunplay", a song by Rick Ross from the 2009 album Deeper Than Rap
 Gun Play, a 1935 American Western film

Firearms
 Gun fu, a style of close-quarters gunfight resembling a martial arts battle that combines firearms with hand-to-hand combat and melee weapons
 Gunspinning, the act of a gunfighter twirling their handgun around their trigger finger
 Shootout, a gun battle between armed groups using guns

See also
 Gunnery (disambiguation)